NRP Arpão (S161) is a Tridente-class attack submarine of the Portuguese Navy. It was commissioned in 2010.

References

Tridente-class submarines
Attack submarines
2010 ships